The Romanian men's national 3x3 team represents Romania in international 3x3 basketball matches and is controlled by the Romanian Basketball Federation.

Senior Competitions

Performance at World Championships

Performance at European Championship

Current squad
Squad members for 2014 FIBA Europe 3x3 Championships.

See also
 3x3 basketball
 Romania women's national 3x3 team

External links
 Romanian Basketball Federation 

Basketball in Romania
Basketball teams in Romania
3
Men's national 3x3 basketball teams